CashTime Life was a South African Music Publishing Company and Entertainment Company, as well as a record label and Management Service. The CashTime Fam was a South African hip hop collective, consisted of South African hip hop musicians, performers and entertainers K.O, Ma-E, Maggz, Kid X, Smashis, AB Crazy and Ntukza.

Roster

Current roster 
 (CashTime is No Longer Active)

Former acts 
 K.O
 Ma-E
 Maggz
 AB Crazy
 Ntukza
 Zingah
 Nomuzi aka Moozlie
 Michamelo
 KiD X
 zandie_buthelezi 

 andi
AirDee(Producer)

Full Discography

Compilation albums

Solo studio albums

Mixtapes

Nomuzi's Departure 
Cashtime Life CEO Thabiso Khati announced in March 2016 that artist Nomuzi Mabena otherwise known as Moozlie, was no longer part of the Cashtime Roster. It was said that due to the differences between Nomuzi's vision and the label's vision for her development in her music career, the label opted to release her from her contract. Nomuzi departed on good terms with the label.

References 

South African record labels
South African independent record labels
Record labels established in 2010
Hip hop record labels